The Mistral One Design Class (MOD) is a windsurfing class chosen by the International Sailing Federation (ISAF) for use at the Olympic Regatta in Atlanta 1996, Sydney 2000 and Athens 2004. Starting with the 2008 Summer Olympics it was replaced by the RS:X class, which will be replaced by the iQFoil class for the 2024 Summer Olympics.

Description

The MOD was first produced in 1970s. Worldwide, there are more than 30,000 build since. They are light and tough. In the right hands, they can be sailed in windspeeds of between  depending on sea conditions.

The International Class Organization IMCO have established over 50 National Class Organisations.

Events

Olympics

Men's World Championship

Women's World Championship

References

See also
Windsurfing
RS:X (sailboard)
Formula Windsurfing
Sailing at the Summer Olympics
Windsurfing World Championships

 
Classes of World Sailing
Olympic sailing classes
Windsurfing boards